Dante's Inferno is a 2010 action-adventure game developed by Visceral Games and published by Electronic Arts. The game was released for PlayStation 3, Xbox 360 and Playstation Portable in February 2010. The PlayStation Portable version was developed by Artificial Mind and Movement.

The game's story is loosely based on Inferno, the first canticle of Dante Alighieri's Divine Comedy. It follows Dante, imagined as a Templar knight from The Crusades, who, guided by the spirit of the poet Virgil, must fight through the nine Circles of Hell to rescue Beatrice from the clutches of Lucifer himself. In the game, players control Dante from a third-person perspective. His primary weapon is a scythe that can be used in a series of combination attacks and finishing moves. Many attack combinations and abilities can be unlocked in exchange for souls, an in-game currency that is collected upon defeating enemies. Some downloadable contents were subsequently released, including Dark Forest, a prequel story, and Trials of St. Lucia, which features St. Lucia as a playable character.

Before the game's release, Dante's Inferno underwent a prominent, elaborate, and at times controversial marketing campaign led by the game's publisher Electronic Arts. This included the release of a fake religious game called Mass: We Pray, a motion controller-based game supposedly allowing players to engage in an interactive prayer and church sermon.

The game received generally positive reviews by critics, with praise for the gameplay, art direction, voice acting, story, sound design, and depiction of Hell. It also spawned a comic book series and an animated movie, Dante's Inferno: An Animated Epic, which was released direct-to-DVD simultaneously with it.

Gameplay 

Dante's Inferno is an action-adventure game. The player controls Dante, the game's protagonist, and engages in fast-paced combat, platforming and environment-based puzzles. In the game, Dante's primary weapon is a scythe that can be used in a series of combination attacks and finishing moves. He has a Holy Cross that fires a volley of energy as a projectile attack. In addition, Dante can use numerous magic based attacks and abilities channeled from a mana pool to help in combat, many of which are obtained as the game progresses. A quick time event system is used when attempting to discharge the demon of its master (unbind from host) and during boss fights, where players must press the highlighted button on screen in order to continue the chain of attacks, or be countered and wounded otherwise.

Many attack combinations and abilities can be unlocked in exchange for souls, an in-game currency that is collected upon defeating enemies or locating soul fountains. Each of these skills fall into the Holy (represented by blue orbs) skill tree. At the beginning of the game, the skill tree is equal in power, but as Dante gains more Holy experience, more abilities become available for purchase. Experience is collected through the game's "Absolve" system, where upon defeating enemies, Dante can absolve and save them with the Holy Cross. Much experience can also be accumulated in absolving the damned souls of many famous figures in history that appear in Dante Alighieri's original The Divine Comedy determining their fate, players enter a mini game where the characters' "sins" move towards the center of the screen, pressing required action symbols once the sin is in place. Players are rewarded with more souls and experience as the number of sins collected increases.

The game involves large sections of platforming, including swinging between ropes and climbing walls, both of which can involve hazards such as fire or swinging blades. There is also a series of environment-based puzzle sequences that can impair the progress of Dante's quest, such as requiring the correct positioning of movable objects or pulling levers at the appropriate time. In addition, there are numerous hidden passages where Biblical relics can be found and equipped to improve Dante's abilities.

Plot 
The story follows Dante (Graham McTavish), a Templar knight from the Crusade who has committed numerous atrocities during the Third Crusade. Dante is entrusted to keep a group of prisoners safe so King Richard I could obtain a holy relic, the True Cross, from Saladin. But once he brutally slaughters them, Dante is ordered to take the holy relic. During the attack, Dante is stabbed in the back by an assassin, whereupon the grim reaper (Dee Bradley Baker) appears and condemns Dante for his sins, despite being promised by a bishop that his sins would be absolved. Dante refuses to accept his fate, vows to redeem himself, and defeats the grim reaper while taking his scythe. Dante leaves the Crusade, sewing a red holy cross-shaped tapestry into his torso, depicting every sin he has committed in the past. He returns to Florence, only to find his lover Beatrice Portinari (Vanessa Branch) and father Alighiero (JB Blanc) brutally murdered. Beatrice's soul appears before Dante, telling him that she knew he would come after her before a shadowy manifestation of Lucifer (John Vickery) drags her into darkness. After making it to a chapel, Dante blesses the holy cross that Beatrice gave him upon making their vows to be true to each other, to protect him against the evils that await. Upon doing so, a crack in the earth opens up, allowing Dante to descend to the Gates of Hell.

At the Gates, he encounters Virgil (Bart McCarthy), who knows of Dante's past sins, yet agrees to guide him through the Nine Circles of Hell in exchange for Beatrice putting in a word for him in Heaven. Dante begins his descent at the shores of Hell where the newly damned souls are forced aboard the great ferry of Charon (Bart McCarthy), a massive living ship. Charon denies Dante passage due to not being truly dead, while commenting that Beatrice made "a very foolish wager", but Dante sneaks aboard in order to sail across. After this, Dante tears Charon's head off using a beast-mount and throws it away, causing the boat to crash, though Charon's head survives due to being made eternal by divine power. After arriving at Limbo, Dante confronts the serpentine Judge of the Damned, King Minos (Richard Moll). After Minos denies Dante passage deeper into Hell, Dante fights the Judge and kills him. Dante then enters the second circle, Lust, where he enters the Carnal Tower to find Beatrice, whose soul is slowly being corrupted into a succubus by Lucifer, who also reveals to her that Dante broke his vows to Beatrice, sleeping with a captive woman back in Acre, as the woman offered to have sex with him in exchange for sparing the life of her "brother". Reaching the top of the tower, Dante confronts and slays the gigantic Queen Cleopatra (Alison Lees-Taylor) and her lover Mark Antony (Lewis Macleod). Entering the third circle Gluttony, Dante slays its guardian the "Great Worm" Cerberus. It is here where Lucifer shows Dante how Beatrice and his father Alighiero met their demise, both being slain by the assassin from Acre, revealed to be the husband, not the brother as she claimed, of the captive Dante slept with.

In the fourth circle; Greed, Dante encounters the greatly deformed soul of his father Alighiero. After overcoming the puzzles of the fallen God of Wealth Plutus, Dante defeats Alighiero and uses Beatrice's now-enchanted cross to absolve him. In the fifth circle, Anger, Dante begins to float across the vile River Styx on what appears to be a floating platform. Upon reaching the other side, however, the platform is in fact the top of the head of the gigantic fiery demon Phlegyas who attacks Dante. Overcoming this, Lucifer appears before Dante with Beatrice, revealing that she is damned because she made a bet with him that Dante would be faithful to her, and Dante's infidelity damned her soul to Lucifer. Beatrice, now broken-hearted by Dante's betrayals, willingly gives herself to Lucifer by eating three seeds of a pomegranate. Dante rides atop Phlegyas who he controls to smash down the walls of the City of Dis and into the sixth circle, Heresy. Beyond lies the seventh circle, Violence, including Phlegethon and the Wood of Suicides. Within the woods Dante encounters his mother Bella. He becomes deeply saddened and enraged, having been told as a child that she died of an illness but in fact hanged herself because of his father's cruelty. Absolving her of her sin, he continues beyond the woods to the Abominable Sands for those violent against God, where Dante also encounters his former comrade Crusader and future brother-in-law Francesco, who is now a horribly disfigured version of his former self and desires revenge against Dante for his state of being. Upon defeating Francesco, Dante absolves him and descends into the eighth circle, Fraud.

Before Dante can reach Lucifer, Beatrice puts him through the challenges of ten stages of the Malebolge, each depicting the fraudsters throughout history from simple thieves to the false popes. At the entrance of the ninth and last circle, Treachery, Dante insists to Beatrice that he has faced all of his sins. Beatrice reminds him that he slaughtered the Saracen prisoners out of anger and that Francesco died taking the blame for it. Realizing that he has sinned beyond redemption, Dante admits that his place is in Hell and asks Beatrice to forgive him. This act of supreme sacrifice undoes Beatrice's transformation and restores her to her former self. As Dante watches, the Archangel Gabriel carries Beatrice's soul away, promising Dante that he will see Beatrice again and that his redemption is close at hand.

Journeying through the icy realm of Treachery and fighting his way to Lake Cocytus, Dante finally confronts Lucifer himself, an enormous demon chained within the frozen lake. After defeating the giant demon, Lucifer reveals that several enormous chains Dante had destroyed to proceed were the Chains of Judecca, which kept him imprisoned in Lake Cocytus and inside the body of the giant demon. Lucifer reveals that he merely used Beatrice as bait to get Dante to break the chains and free him. Lucifer emerges from the giant monster in his true form, a horned, satyr-like monster, and battles Dante. Through great struggle, Dante is able to defeat Lucifer and impales him on the grim reaper's Scythe. Before Dante can attack again, Lucifer summons the vision of the assassin stabbing Dante in Acre; which shows him collapsing to the ground. Dante is horrified to realize that he was actually killed and thus cannot be free. Lucifer gleefully reveals that, now free, he will rise, overthrow God and eliminating all that is good from the universe forever. But Dante, with the aid of the souls he gained through his trials, absolves himself and re-imprisons Lucifer again by binding his hands in the ice lake.

Dante is then taken to Purgatory, where he sees himself near Mount Purgatory with Beatrice's soul awaiting him in Paradise. He then removes the tapestry from his chest and walks away with Beatrice's soul. As the removed tapestry disintegrates, it transforms into a snake and Lucifer's haunting laugh echoes for the final time, showing that Lucifer awaits his revenge and/or that he will only be destroyed until the Last Judgment.

Release 

A playable demo was released for PlayStation 3 on December 10, 2009, and for Xbox 360 on December 24, 2009. Dante's Inferno was first released in Australasia on February 4, 2010, and later across Europe on February 5 and in North America on February 9, 2010.

Special editions 
In addition to the standard retail copy of the game, a second limited special edition of the game for both the Xbox 360 and PlayStation 3 was released alongside known as the "Death Edition". Along with the standard copy of the game, the Death Edition was packaged in a fold out card packaging depicting each circle of hell as well as a second bonus disc that featured a making-of documentary, the documentary "Dante in History", the full soundtrack, a documentary on the creation of the music and audio, a digital art book (Barlowe's Inferno) edited by visual designer Wayne Barlowe, over 10 minutes of scenes from Dante's Inferno: An Animated Epic, and a digital reprint of the complete original poem in English by Henry Wadsworth Longfellow. The edition also included a voucher containing an online activated code for an additional skin model for Dante: the space suit of Isaac Clarke, the main character from Visceral's previous game Dead Space. UK retailer Gamestation also gave away miniature figurines of Dante to those who pre-ordered the game. The edition was originally released in Europe, and later also in Australia along with the standard copy on February 15, 2010, exclusive to EB Games.

In North America, unlike the Europe and Australia release, a special version called the "Divine Edition" was released in place of the standard copy for the PlayStation 3 only. Similar to the Death Edition, the Divine Edition includes nearly all the same features except the Isaac Clarke costume and the animated scene but instead includes a code for the Dark Forest downloadable content, to be released later in March.

On May 14, 2010, the "St. Lucia Edition" was released in Italy, containing the Dark Forest and Trials of St Lucia DLCs and St. Lucia as a playable character in the cooperative gameplay.

Downloadable content 
Upon its release, a series of downloadable content (DLC) game packs were released, each containing a number of souls, used for purchasing new abilities. The first contained 500 souls and was free of charge while the rest contained 1500, 3000 and 5000 souls and cost a relatively small amount and could only be downloaded once.

The first traditional piece of downloadable content was released a month after release on March 4, entitled Dark Forest, a prologue level loosely based on the opening of The Divine Comedy, that sees Dante in a dark forest before meeting Virgil. The content includes two new enemies known as the "Forest Siren" and "Death Knight" and involves a series of puzzles to overcome. In addition to the level, the download also includes an additional "Disco Inferno" costume, a novelty piece in the style of polyester disco fashion wear.

Numerous alternative costumes have also been released, including Florentine Dante based on the real life poet Dante Alighieri released on February 18, 2010 and Animated Film Dante, based on the appearance of the character from Dante's Inferno: An Animated Epic, released one week later.

Trials of St Lucia, released on April 29, 2010, features cooperative gameplay and a game-editor. Players are able to share their created maps and levels with others. The new playable character in this DLC is St. Lucia, a Christian martyr described as Dante's guardian angel.

Marketing 

Before the game's release, Dante's Inferno underwent a prominent, at times elaborate marketing campaign led by the game's publisher Electronic Arts. The numerous advertisements highlighted certain sins associated with the circles of hell, at times promoting fake services before accusing the viewer of the sin linked to it.

Electronic Arts partnered with GameStop for a one-day promotion of Dante's Inferno on September 9, 2009 (9/9/9). Those that pre-ordered the game were offered a $6.66 discount, the Number of the Beast. In addition, EA conducted an unsolicited mailing in which checks for $200 were sent to selected video game critics, with the following note: "In Dante's Inferno, Greed is a two-headed beast. Hoarding wealth feeds one beast, and squandering it satiates the other. By cashing this check you succumb to avarice by hoarding filthy lucre, but by not cashing it, you waste it, and thereby surrender to prodigality. Make your choice and suffer the consequence for your sin. And scoff not, for consequences are imminent."

A viral marketing campaign was also launched featuring a website and ad for a fake religious game called Mass: We Pray, a motion controller-based game supposedly allowing players to engage in an interactive prayer and church sermon. When attempting to order the game, the website deems you a heretic and plays to a trailer for Dante's Inferno, as well as providing links to the related Facebook application called "Go to Hell". The application, created by Visceral Games lets users condemn their friends, groups, or photos to one of the nine circles of hell where they can then vote to punish or absolve them, or torment them with activities like "beast massage" or "succubus castration."

Later in October 2009, EA sent a series of packages to Veronica Belmont at Qore, the PlayStation: The Official Magazine offices and Ben "Yahtzee" Croshaw of the Escapist's Zero Punctuation column. The package contained a small wooden box which, when opened, played the Rick Astley song "Never Gonna Give You Up", thus "Rickrolling" the journalists that received it. The music could not be stopped through any means other than destroying the box using the hammer and goggles provided. After destroying the box, such as Veronica Belmont who posted the act on YouTube, a note read that they had given into Wrath as the note then found within the box predicted.

EA produced a commercial for the game that was shown during Super Bowl XLIV, a fast-paced cinematic of Dante's descent into hell, overplayed by what was considered an unusual use of Bill Withers' song "Ain't No Sunshine". Time magazine reporter James Poniewozik referred to the ad as "something magical and funny."  According to EA product manager Phil Marineu, the decision to air the ad was to concentrate on more solid titles that they believe can break through to the masses.

Another secretly fake commercial for the fictional company "Hawk Panther" encouraged viewers to visit the Hawk Panther website in order to be able to steal their best friend's girlfriend. If the link to find out more about the Hawk Panther systems is clicked on a message appears stating, "TREACHERY! Thou are condemned to the 9th Circle. Thou hast broken the bonds of trust with thy kindred. Even conspiring to stealeth thy best friend's soul mate is the worst kind of mortal offense imaginable. You shall pay for thy treachery by spending an eternity immersed up to your face, the place where shame shows itself, in the putrid, frozen waters of Hell." The site also shows a trailer of Dante's Inferno and a link to buy the game.

The Facebook application developer Lolapps similarly adapted a Facebook role-playing game, Battle of the Damned, that lets users fight through the nine circles of hell to rescue their murdered and damned wife. It rose nearly 1 million monthly active users in less than a year after launching.

Prior to Dante's Infernos release, in June 2009, a protest began during E3 2009 in Los Angeles to oppose the game. Around 20 protesters, claiming to be from a church in Ventura County, held up signs that called the game sacrilegious and labeled it possibly insensitive to people's beliefs. Protesters even went as far as calling EA the anti-christ. This led to EA being accused by many people of staging the fiasco to use it as a marketing hoax. A few days later, it was officially confirmed by EA spokesman Tammy Scachter that they had hired people to protest the game and that there was no actual protest. However, in the aftermath of this revelation, several Christian bloggers protested to this, calling it an "anti-Christian" stunt.

Reception

Dante's Inferno 

Dante's Inferno received "generally favorable reviews" for the PlayStation 3 version and "mixed or average reviews" for the Xbox 360 and PlayStation Portable versions from critics, according to review aggregator Metacritic. While there was substantial praise for the art style and level design, numerous critics drew unfavorable comparisons with Sony's popular God of War series, among other more fundamental criticisms, such as monotonous and repetitive gameplay in the latter half of the game.

One of the most praised aspects was the game's depiction of Hell, considered creative yet graphic in nature. GamePro found the unique designs of the circles of Hell to be "impressively constructed", getting "a lot of mileage out of the unique setting". While some critics like IGN acknowledged the liberties taken with the original source material, they still observed that "much of what you see is appropriate for a game that tries to explore the extreme nature of Hell and its punishments", calling the overall style "visually impressive". Other critics like GameSpy even found some enemy and setting designs "shocking" yet still could "appreciate that this is Hell, and it's supposed to be disturbing".

However, some reviews felt the creativity waned towards the end of the game, such as GameSpot who felt "Dante's epic quest loses momentum long before you reach the end", praising earlier levels such as Lust and Gluttony yet criticizing the 10 stage challenge level of Fraud and the use of enemies outside of their respective circle. PlayStation Official Magazine – UK also echoed this view, saying that the game was "just going through motions for the last three or four hours", despite what it considered to have a "robust fighting system" and being "visually strong".

The most recurring comment over the gameplay of Dante's Inferno was its similarities to the God of War games. Destructoid felt that being similar to what is regarded as a great game is a positive by stating "You're not going to find a wholly original gameplay experience with Dante's Inferno, but that doesn't mean it's not a hell of an entertaining package - it's one that fans of action shouldn't miss." Eurogamer on the other hand felt the game was "a God of War clone at its core", that while "not a terrible game, it's just not an original one", a view GameTrailers echoed by stating "battles can be engaging, but lack some of the grace and refinement exhibited by games like God of War". While Game Informer also found the gameplay to be too familiar, they did find the additional elements such as the punish/absolve mechanic and usable relics to give "Dante's Inferno some individuality".

Wired gave the PS3 version a score of seven stars out of ten and called it "a ballsy take on literature that worships at the altar of God of War."  However, Nick Cowen of The Daily Telegraph gave the same version six out of ten, saying that it was "by no means a terrible game, but it's not an essential title and I wouldn't recommend paying full price for it. If a sequel is on the cards – as is hinted by the ending – the developers would do well to institute a more consistent level of quality. Until then, one can't damn the players of Dante's Inferno for trading the nine circles of hell for a trip to Hades with Kratos." The A.V. Club gave the Xbox 360 version a C+, saying, "The game's rivers of blood, corpse-piles, and wailing souls make for a morbid, depression-inducing milieu. It's a relief to be shut out of the place once the final credits roll." In Japan, Famitsu gave the PS3 and Xbox 360 versions a score of all four eights for a total of 32 out of 40.

Regarding such similarities, in an interview for PlayStation Official Magazine – UK, God of War III director Stig Asmussen instead praised the game, stating "We've been intrigued about Dante's Inferno. This is my favourite genre, and the more people that are making [these games] the better", going on to say "and this is a really rich story they're building on, it's very interesting. The day that the demo came out we were trying to download it on PSN at midnight. We all wanted to see it."

Columbia University Professor Teodolinda Barolini, a former president of the Dante Society of America, criticized the game for its depiction of Beatrice, declaring, "Of all the things that are troubling, the sexualization and infantilization of Beatrice are the worst. Beatrice is the human girl who is dead and is now an agent of the divine. She is not to be saved by him, she is saving him. That's the whole point! Here, she has become the prototypical damsel in distress. She's this kind of bizarrely corrupted Barbie doll." Other reviews of the game include similar comments from professors regarding the characters: "Beatrice saves Dante... not the other way around," says Professor Arielle Saiber, an Italian literature professor at Bowdoin College.

United States NPD Group sales data showed that the PS3 and Xbox 360 versions of Dante's Inferno sold 242,500 and 224,700 copies respectively on February 2010, its first month of release. The two editions also debuted together on the UK's top 10 games list for that month.

Trials of St. Lucia 

The Xbox 360 version of the Trials of St. Lucia DLC received "favorable" reviews, while the PS3 version received "average" reviews, according to the review aggregation website Metacritic. GameTrailers said that the Xbox 360 version "may be a little steep [at 10 dollars], but it gives Dante a shot of much-needed replayability. With online co-op, a seemingly-enthusiastic community, and a suite of solid online features, the original game suddenly feels like it has some legs."  However, GameSpot said that the PS3 version "does an admirable job of turning the worst idea from the original adventure into something entertaining, but it's still hampered by the same problems that made those initial trials such a drag. It's only entertaining to swing your blood-soaked scythe for so long because the combat is shallow and the objectives only offer a slight change to the core experience. However, the in-depth editor, extra playable character, and cooperative mode are different enough to lure back anyone anxious to be wrapped up in hell's clutches for a few more hours."

Controversy 
In October 2009, it was announced that the game would include a PlayStation 3 trophy and an Xbox 360 achievement entitled "Bad Nanny", which is awarded to players for killing monsters resembling children, supposedly the lost souls of unbaptized infants. This sparked a conflict with the International Nanny Association (INA), in which they encouraged supporters to oppose the game. The INA claimed that the achievement is offensive to real nannies and that it also promotes real-life violence. The INA asked the Entertainment Software Rating Board (ESRB) to omit the reward and elements of infant violence. The ESRB insisted that its role was merely to label products appropriately, not to censor them, so their request could not be met. Dante's Inferno was released with the "Bad Nanny" achievement intact.

Legacy

Animated film 

Film Roman, the Starz Entertainment unit behind Dead Space: Downfall, released an animated direct-to-DVD version of the story that was released simultaneously with the video game. The Dante's Inferno project had separate anime studios being tapped to create visuals of the nine levels of the Inferno. Starz Entertainment is looking to sell both animated films to international TV buyers at the MIP market. The animation studios that participated in the making of Dante's Inferno: An Animated Epic, in order, are Film Roman, Manglobe, Dong Woo, JM Animation, and Production I.G. The released movie shows a difference in storyline and has been divided into four different styles.

Comics 
WildStorm published a six-part comic book series based on the video game from December 2009 (two month before the video game release) through May 2010. The series was written by Christos Gage with art by Diego Latorre.

Possible live action film 
In 2013 it was reported that Universal Studios is developing a live action film based on the video game with director Fede Álvarez to direct and produced by Eric Newman and Marc Abraham with EA Entertainment vice president Patrick O'Brien. However, no updates have been provided since the announcement.

Backwards compatibility 
As of July 17, 2018, Dante's Inferno was playable on the Xbox One as a backwards compatible title.  It was also added to the EA Play Vault on July 19, 2018, as well as Xbox Game Pass.

Future 
Since the game ends in a cliffhanger with Dante reaching Mount Purgatory, it was widely speculated that a sequel, based on the second poem in The Divine Comedy, Purgatorio, would enter production. Despite this, it was announced that Visceral had no plans for a sequel. Zach Mumbach of the studio stated: "I'm sure that if enough people are like, 'I got 60 dollars for Purgatory or Paradiso,' then we would make that game. But I don't know. I don't get to make those decisions". In November 2011, Joshua Rubin announced that he had been hired as a writer for a video game sequel that was heavily hinted to be a sequel to Dante's Inferno. However, no further information regarding a sequel has been forthcoming. In 2016, though not officially confirmed, an industry insider stated that the sequel was cancelled, and that it would feature Dante through Purgatory and some bits of Hell, with angels as opponents. Visceral Games was eventually closed in October 2017.

Notes

References

External links 

 
 
 
 

2010 video games
Action-adventure games
Behaviour Interactive games
Dark fantasy video games
Electronic Arts games
Fantasy video games set in the Middle Ages
Hack and slash games
Multiplayer and single-player video games
Mythology in popular culture
Obscenity controversies in video games
PlayStation 3 games
PlayStation Portable games
Fiction about purgatory
Fiction about the Devil
Video games about angels
Video games about demons
Video games about religion
Video games adapted into comics
Video games based on poems
Video games based on the Bible
Video games developed in Canada
Video games set in the 14th century
Video games set in Acre, Israel
Video games set in hell
Video games set in Italy
Visceral Games
Works based on Inferno (Dante)
Xbox 360 games
Video games developed in the United States